Gus Giordano (July 10, 1923 – March 9, 2008), born August Thomas Giordano III, was an American jazz dancer, teacher, and choreographer. He performed on Broadway and in theater and television. Giordano taught jazz dance to thousands around the world. He founded the Gus Giordano Dance School in 1953, Gus Giordano Jazz Dance Chicago in 1963, created the First American Jazz Dance World Congress in 1990 and is the author of Anthology of American Jazz Dance (1975). He taught at institutions around the world including American Ballet Theatre, The American University of Paris, Duke University, Joffrey Ballet, New York University, and hundreds more. Giordano was one of the founders of theatrical or Broadway jazz dance styles, not to be confused with African American vernacular jazz styles that he drew upon.

Personal life
Giordano was born in St. Louis, Missouri, in 1923. At the age of five, he traveled to New Orleans, where his cousin taught him the Charleston dance step to the acrg, "The Shoeshiner's Drag", thus introducing him to jazz music and dance. After this trip, Giordano was hooked on dance. He returned to St. Louis and studied with local dance teacher Minette Buchman, whom he credits for early dance training. He also studied with vocal teachers and guest artists visiting his area. He took classes in ballet and modern dance. At this time, he did not take jazz classes, because jazz dance as a class did not exist. He continued to dance through his childhood and spent summers in New York City training with Hanya Holm, Katherine Dunham, Peter Gennaro, and Alwin Nikolais. He auditioned and was hired at the Roxy Theatre in New York where he performed four shows a day.

During World War II, Giordano joined the Marines, where he was trained as a bomber. He was also a performer in shows at the Hollywood Canteen and at military bases around the country. He was stationed in China. After the war, Giordano returned to the University of Missouri to finish his Bachelor of Arts degree. Giordano met his wife, Peg Thoelke, while in college. He was a member of the Lambda Chi Alpha fraternity and Peg was in the Delta Gamma sorority. They married on October 14, 1950, in St. Louis, MO.

Giordano’s wife passed away from a heart attack on May 10, 1993.

Giordano died on March 9, 2008, of pneumonia at the age of 84. He had four children.

Career
Giordano appeared on Broadway in Joshua Logan’s Wish You Were Here. He also performed in Paint Your Wagon, On the Town, Guys and Dolls, Brigadoon, Pajama Game and several television variety shows, such as The Perry Como Show and The Ed Sullivan Show, Martin & Lewis and The Colgate Comedy Hour. He enjoyed the work but did not find it fulfilling.

Giordano was offered a job at The Film Council of America in Evanston, IL. He accepted the position and moved from New York to the Chicago area. He began teaching in one of the offices in the same building as The Film Council in 1953 and established Gus Giordano Dance School in 1953. He was the first to put dance on television by teaching a 15-minute series called JAZZ DANCE on WTTW Channel 11 in Chicago. He helped produce, choreograph and performed in several award-winning shows on PBS, including Requiem for a Slave, Michelangelo – A Portrait in Dance, The Rehearsal and Chic Chicago for WGN.

Towards the end of his life, Gus Giordano Dance School resided in Chicago, where he always dreamed his school would be one day.

Giordano's technique was based in modern, learned from his teacher Katherine Dunham. His class begins with strong floor work gained from another of his teachers, Hanya Holm. He emphasizes strength from the start of class. He adds his own "undulating movement that emanated from the pelvis and rolled through the chest and arms."

In the mid-1970s, he compiled his teachings and techniques into Anthology of American Jazz Dance, which includes over 250 technical pages detailing Giordano technique. In 1992, Giordano published Jazz Dance Class: Beginning Thru Advanced, an illustrated guide to American theatrical jazz dance for students and teachers alike.  This book broke down, in detail, warm-ups, individual techniques and jazz combinations at three levels: beginner, intermediate and advanced.

Ten years after his studio opened, Ann Barzel (dance critic) asked Giordano to perform with his classes for visiting Bolshoi Ballet dancers who wanted to see what jazz dance looked like. He took his senior students and choreographed a number for them to perform. Shortly after this performance, Gus founded Giordano Jazz Dance Chicago in 1963. Gus Giordano Jazz Dance Chicago was renamed in 2009 to Giordano Dance Chicago by his daughter, Nan Giordano. It currently performs at Chicago's Harris Theater. Many dancers became part of the company after spending time in Giordano II, the "apprentice" company. Giordano II performed in large pieces with the company.

Giordano founded the American Jazz Dance World Congress in 1990. Giordano invited many jazz master teachers in his networks to teach at JDWC including Robert Battle, Homer Bryant, Randy Duncan, Frank Hatchett, Liz Imperio, Joe Lanteri, Luigi, Matt Mattox, Pattie Obey and Joe Tremaine. Since its inception, Congresses have been held in Phoenix, AZ (1998), San José, Costa Rica (2004), Chicago (2002, 2005, 2007, 2009), Evanston, IL (1990, 1992, 1994), Wiesbaden, Germany (1997), Nagoya, Japan (1995), Monterrey, Mexico (2001), Buffalo, NY (1999, 2000, 2003), Pittsburgh, PA (2012) and at Washington, D.C.'s Kennedy Center (1996).

Giordano’s theater choreography credits include A Christmas Carol at the Goodman Theater for over 15 years, Northwestern University’s Waa-Mu Show for over 25 years and the Chicago revival of Hair.

Giordano received numerous honors and awards for his work throughout his lifetime. In 1980, Giordano's television show The Rehearsal won an Emmy, the PBS award and the Ohio State award. In 1991, Giordano received the "Circle of Dance Award" from Dance Teacher Now Magazine. In 1985, April 25 was declared Gus Giordano Day in the state of Illinois by Governor James R Thompson. In 1986 he was the American Ambassador of Jazz Dance to Brazil. In 1989, October 13 was declared Gus Giordano Day in the City of Chicago by Mayor Richard M Daley. In 1993, he received the Ruth Page Lifetime Service to the Field Award along with his wife, Peg Giordano. In 1996, he was "The Scholar-in-Residence" award from the University of Missouri. This award goes to "distinguished alumnus" and "outstanding individuals that have made a substantial mark in their field of study". During that time he performed for the last time at the University, "Tribute to Peg", a number he choreographed in memory of this late wife. In 1997, he served as National Spokesperson of National Dance Week. In 1991, he won Katherine Dunham Award for "excellence and great contributions to the arts". In 2005, he received the Heritage Award from the National Dance Association for his contributions to dance education. In 2005, he received the Chicago Senior Citizen of The Year Award from Mayor Richard M Daley.

Tribute
Dance scholars have praised Giordano for establishing Broadway or theatrical jazz dance as an internationally recognized artistic medium. Ruth Page said "Giordano knows more about jazz dance than anyone, probably in the world, and jazz dance is a difficult thing to teach; there’s more creativity involved unlike [the more structured] classical dance."

Giordano taught and many performers, teachers, choreographers, including Ann-Margret, Gregory Hines, Daryl Hannah, and Patrick Swayze.

In 2009, Giordano's daughter, Amy Giordano, produced Gus: An American Icon, a documentary about Gus Giordano. Narrated by former Giordano student Colleen Zenk, the film includes interviews with Giordano's friends and collaborators. The film won prizes for Excellence at the Canada International Film Festival and for Best Documentary at the 2010 Burbank International Film Festival.

References

External links
 Gus Giordano Dance School official website
 Giordano Dance Chicago official website
 IMDB Page for Gus: An American Icon
Gus Giordano Papers at the Newberry Library

American choreographers
American jazz dancers
2008 deaths
People from Chicago
1923 births